Dans la légende is the second studio album by French cloud rap duo PNL. It was released on 16 September 2016 through the duo's own QLF Records. The album was preceded by the singles "La vie est belle", "DA", "J'suis QLF", "Naha", "Onizuka", "Bené" and "Jusqu'au dernier gramme".

Promotion
To promote the album, PNL went on a six-city tour in France through 2017. In July 2020, the duo released an hour long tour documentary on Netflix France from the tour.

Track listing

Charts

Weekly charts

Year-end charts

Certifications

References

External links
 Official website

2016 albums
PNL (rap duo) albums